Robert Neale may refer to:

 Robert Neale (pilot) (1914–1994), United States Navy dive-bomber pilot
 Robert E. Neale, American minister, psychologist, paperfolder, and magician

See also
Robert Neal (born 1956), Australian rules footballer
Robert R. Neall (born 1948), American politician
Bob Neal (disambiguation)
Robert Neill (disambiguation)